Tragedy Girls is a 2017 American comedy slasher film directed by Tyler MacIntyre, written by Chris Lee Hill and MacIntyre, and starring Alexandra Shipp, Brianna Hildebrand, Josh Hutcherson, Craig Robinson, Kevin Durand and Jack Quaid. It was released on October 20, 2017, by Gunpowder & Sky.

Plot
High school seniors McKayla Hooper and Sadie Cunningham live in the Midwestern town of Rosedale and run a true crime blog called Tragedy Girls. They are willing to do anything to get more followers. They use their friend Craig as bait to capture serial killer Lowell Orson Lehmann and ask him to aid them, but he refuses. The two decide to keep him captive, commit murders themselves and use Lehmann as a fall guy. The next day, Craig is missing, presumed to have run away. McKayla, Sadie, and their friend Jordan attempt to convince Rosedale that there is a serial killer running loose, but they only earn the ire of Jordan's father, Sheriff Welch. When McKayla's ex-boyfriend Toby amasses more followers on Twitter than the girls, McKayla and Sadie kill him. His death is ruled an accident, enraging the two girls.

They next kill cheerleading captain Syl and cut her body into pieces in order to ensure that her death is ruled a homicide. At Syl's memorial service, a local firefighter, Big Al, vows to catch the killer. Meanwhile, Lehmann attempts to turn McKayla against Sadie by convincing her that Sadie will use her to do the dirty work and take all of the credit. The girls plot to kill Big Al while he works out at the gym. Big Al fights back, but the two narrowly manage to stab him and decapitate him with a bench press. Afterwards, Jordan arrives and reveals he has stolen the serial killer case files from his father.

Mayor Campbell calls an emergency town meeting, and McKayla and Sadie rile the townspeople into turning against local law enforcement by showing them to be incompetent, including sending the people of the town a picture of Big Al's severed head. They hold a march in defiance of the killer. However, Lehmann escapes and murders Mayor Campbell. Jordan has a falling out with McKayla and Sadie and leaves them, in support of his father. An enraged McKayla discovers Jordan has stolen a phone belonging to her that has videos of the murders, and goads Sadie into heading to Jordan's house to kill him. Jordan reveals that he broke into the school and stole McKayla's psychological profile; he suspects her of being the killer. They are interrupted when Lehmann breaks into the Welch residence and brutally stabs Jordan. McKayla awakens the sleeping Sheriff Welch by breaking his window; he drives Lehmann off and saves Jordan. Sadie takes the opportunity to destroy McKayla's stolen phone.

Two weeks later, Sadie is publicly honored by Welch; she does not acknowledge McKayla in her speech. The two have a falling out. Prom arrives; Sadie goes with Jordan as her date, while McKayla teams up with Lehmann. After killing their teacher, McKayla confronts Sadie. Unaware that Jordan is listening, she recounts how they murdered Jordan's mother as children. Jordan attempts to flee with Sadie to safety, but they are cornered by Lehmann and McKayla. Lehmann attempts to attack Sadie, but is stopped by McKayla. He turns on her, and McKayla pulls out a gun and shoots Lehmann dead. The girls reconcile, hang Jordan, and – after chain-locking the doors shut – start a fire in the gymnasium that traps and kills 124 prom-goers. In the aftermath, Lehmann is shown to have been blamed for the murders. A grieving Welch resigns as sheriff to focus on charity work, while McKayla and Sadie head off to college to start a new chapter in their lives, as though nothing had happened.

Cast

Release
Tragedy Girls premiered at South by Southwest on March 12, 2017. On July 31, 2017, Gunpowder & Sky acquired distribution rights to the film. The studio released it on October 20, 2017.

Reception
The film has received positive reviews. On review aggregator Rotten Tomatoes, the film has an approval rating of 84% based on 73 reviews, with an average rating of 7/10. The website's critical consensus states, "Tragedy Girls injects familiar teen tropes with just enough up-to-the-minute commentary — and pitch-black humor — to work as an irreverently entertaining diversion."

References

External links
 
 
 
 
 

2017 films
2017 comedy horror films
2010s buddy comedy films
2010s female buddy films
2010s high school films
2010s serial killer films
2010s teen comedy films
2010s teen horror films
American buddy comedy films
American comedy horror films
American female buddy films
American high school films
American serial killer films
American teen comedy films
American teen horror films
Films about social media
2010s English-language films
Films set in the United States
Films shot in Kentucky
2010s American films